This is a list of notable people who are from Alberta, Canada, or have spent a large part or formative part of their career in that province.

A
 William Aberhart – former Premier of Alberta
 John Acorn – naturalist, lecturer at the University of Alberta, research associate at the Royal Tyrrell Museum of Paleontology, and research associate at the E.H. Strickland Entomology Museum
 Ernie Afaganis – sports broadcaster for the Canadian Broadcasting Corporation
 Jack Agrios – lawyer
 David Albahari – Serbian-born author
 Melody Anderson – former actress
 Violet Archer – composer 
 Jann Arden – singer
 Rob Armitage – curler
 Mark Astley – National Hockey League player
 Geoff Aunger – soccer player

B
 Conrad Bain – actor
 Tommy Banks – musician
 Doug Barkley – hockey player
 Cori Bartel – curler
 Hank Bassen – National Hockey League goalie
 Nolan Baumgartner – professional ice hockey player
 Jay Beagle – National Hockey League player
 Will Beauchamp – filmmaker
 Michelle Beaudoin – actress
 Gary Beck – two-time world champion drag racer and member of the Canadian Motorsport Hall of Fame
 Chelsey Bell – curler
 Jill Belland – television host and producer
 Richard Bennett – former Prime Minister of Canada
 Chris Benoit – professional wrestler
 Roloff Beny – photographer
 Moe Berg – singer/songwriter
 Ruth B – singer/songwriter and musician
 Cheryl Bernard – curler
 Blair Betts – ice hockey player
 Manmeet Bhullar – Progressive Conservative politician
 Earle Birney – poet
 Ted Bishop – author of Riding with Rilke
 David Bissett – Olympic bobsledder
 Rosella Bjornson – first female pilot for a commercial airline in North America
 Heather Blush – singer
 Arthur Boileau – Olympic marathon runner
 Bill Borger – first Canadian to both swim the English Channel and climb Mount Everest
 Tyler Bouck – professional hockey player currently with the ERC Ingolstadt of the Deutsche Eishockey Liga
 Bill Bourne – folk and blues singer songwriter, three-time Juno Award winner
 Jay Bouwmeester – ice hockey player
 Trevor Boys – NASCAR driver
 Paul Brandt – country music singer
 Bertram Brockhouse – Nobel Prize winner
 Andrew Brook – philosopher, author of Kant and the Mind
 Gilbert Brulé – ice hockey player
 Johnny Bucyk – ice hockey player 
 Ronnie Burkett – puppeteer
 Nate Burleson – professional American football player, Detroit Lions
 Pat Burns – rancher, businessman, and Canadian Senator

C
 Don Cairns – professional ice hockey player
 Eric Cameron – visual artist
 Elaine Cameron-Weir – visual artist
 Tommy Campbell – actor and stand-up comedian
 Janet Cardiff – artist
 Celeigh Cardinal – singer-songwriter
 Douglas Cardinal – architect
 Gil Cardinal – filmmaker
 Tantoo Cardinal – actress
 Beatrice Carmichael – grand dame of the opera
 Mark Carney – Governor of the Bank of England and Chairman of the G20's Financial Stability Board; formerly governor of the Bank of Canada
 Sean Cheesman – dancer and choreographer
 Terry Chen – film and television actor
 Jason Chimera – ice hockey player
 Ken Chinn (a.k.a. Chi Pig) – lead singer, songwriter and bandleader of SNFU
 Rae Dawn Chong – Canadian-born American actress, the daughter of Maxine Sneed and Tommy Chong
 Tommy Chong – comedian, actor and musician
 Erik Christensen – ice hockey player
 Karl Clark – U of A professor and inventor of oil sands extraction technology
 Allen Coage – professional wrestler known as "Bad News Allen"
 Mac Colville – early star in the National Hockey League
 Neil Colville – early star in the National Hockey League
 Mike Commodore – ice hockey player
 Mike Comrie – ice hockey player
 Michelle Conn – field hockey player
 Patrick Cox – shoe designer
 Paul Cranmer – former CFL player
 Gavin Crawford – actor
 Rafael Cruz – Cuban-born Canadian/American Christian preacher and public speaker; lived in Calgary and later Houston, Texas; father of Ted Cruz
 Ted Cruz – Canadian/American politician and current U.S. Senator for the state of Texas; born in Calgary but grew up in Houston, Texas
 Elisha Cuthbert – actress, moved to Montreal at a very young age, and remained there until she moved to Los Angeles

D

 Kirby Dach – professional hockey player
 John Dahmer – politician
 Cal Dallas – politician
 Carolyn Darbyshire – curler
 Carol-Anne Day – voice actress
 Jason Day – mixed martial arts fighter
 Jake DeBrusk – professional hockey player
 Louie DeBrusk – former professional hockey player; current Hockey Night in Canada colour analyst
 Mac DeMarco – indie rock musician
 Kris Demeanor – poet, musician and actor
 Kent Derricott – actor
 Paula Devicq – actress
 Punch Dickins – aviator and bush pilot; the Dickinsfield community was named in his honour
 Shane Doan – professional hockey player
 Michael Dowse – film director
 Earl Dreeshen – politician
 Darren Dreger – sportscaster
 Trevor Dunn – guitarist, member of 1970s group Fifth Avenue Allstars
 Erica Durance – actress, born in Calgary but raised in Three Hills
 Ryan Duthie – ice hockey player
 Alphonso Davies – professional soccer player for Bayern Munich

E
 Bernard Ebbers – WorldCom co-founder
 Brad Erdos – gridiron football player
 Darren Espanto – Filipino-Canadian child singer
 Lance Evers – professional wrestler known as "Lance Storm"

F
 Joyce Fairbairn – Canadian senator
 Tim Feehan – artist, singer/songwriter, producer, co-owner of Los Angeles recording studio Backroom, mix master
 Leslie Feist – singer/songwriter born in Amherst, Nova Scotia, then moved to Calgary as a child
 John Fennell – luger
 Randy Ferbey – multiple Canadian and World Men's Curling Champion
 Andrew Ference – ice hockey player
 Scott Ferguson – retired professional hockey player
 Nathan Fillion – film and television actor
 Brandon Firla – actor
 David Ford – kayaker
 Malcolm Forsyth – composer
 Dianne Foster – film and television actress
 George Fox – country music singer/songwriter
 Michael J. Fox – film and television actor
 Matt Fraser – ice hockey player
 William Fruet – film and television writer and director
 Grant Fuhr – ice hockey player born in Spruce Grove, Alberta, an Edmonton suburb

G
 Forrest Gainer – rugby union player
 Brendan Gallagher – ice hockey player
 Lynn Garrison – aviator, author and mercenary
 Austin Gary – author and songwriter
 Mark Gatha – former voice actor
 Lucas Gilbertson – voice actor
 Onalea Gilbertson – voice actress
 Allan Gilliland – composer 
 Patrick Gilmore – film and television actor
 John Glenn – Calgary's earliest recorded European settler
 James Gosling – creator of the Java programming language
 Jurgen Gothe – radio broadcaster
 Robert Goulet – singer and film actor
 Henry Grattan Nolan – lawyer and soldier
 Mike Green – professional hockey player (Detroit Red Wings)
 Josh Green – retired professional hockey player
 Mary Greene (1843–1933) – mother superior and educator, established first Roman Catholic school board in Alberta
 Jessica Gregg – short track speed skater
 Randy Gregg – ice hockey player
 Adam Gregory – singer
 Paul Gross – actor
 Brion Gysin – artist and writer

H
 Taylor Hall – professional hockey player
 Owen Hargreaves – professional footballer, plays for Manchester City
 Stephen Harper – former politician and Prime Minister of Canada (2006-2015) and former leader of the Conservative Party of Canada
 Richard Harrison – poet
 Bret Hart – professional wrestler
 Owen Hart – professional wrestler
 Stu Hart – professional wrestler, promoter and trainer
 Teddy Hart – professional wrestler
 Dar Heatherington – politician
 Dany Heatley – professional ice hockey player (Minnesota Wild)
 Ben Hebert – curler
 Meghan Heffern – actress
 Jennifer Heil – freestyle skier born in Spruce Grove, Alberta
 Tricia Helfer – model and actress born in Donalda, Alberta
 Jill Hennessy – television actor
 Jimmy Herman – First Nations actor
 Peter Hide – British-born sculptor, living in Edmonton since 1977
 Stuart Hilborn – automotive engineer
 Arthur Hiller – Hollywood film director and former president of the Directors Guild of America
 David Hoffos – contemporary artist
 Carl Honoré – grew up in Edmonton; journalist and author of In Praise of Slowness
 Richard Hortness – Olympic swimmer
 Kelly Hrudey – ice hockey player
 Jan Hudec – alpine ski racer
 Brian Hughes – smooth jazz guitarist
 William Humberstone – politician in Alberta; municipal councillor in Edmonton
 Tim Hunter – professional National Hockey League player (won the Stanley Cup with the Flames in 1989)
 Mel Hurtig – publisher, author, and politician
 Nancy Huston – novelist; born in Calgary, left at age 15

I
 Jarome Iginla – National Hockey League player
 Earl Ingarfield, Sr. – hockey player
 Brad Isbister – ice hockey player
 Werner Israel – physicist

J
 Tom Jackson – Métis actor, singer and entrepreneur
 Roy Jenson – actor
 Eric Johnson – actor

K
 Athena Karkanis – actor
 Daryl Katz – chairman and chief executive officer of the Katz Group; owner of the Edmonton Oilers
 James Keelaghan – musician
 Jessica Parker Kennedy – actress
 Cassius Khan – Indian classical tabla player and ghazal singer, recipient of Salute to Excellence Award
 Kiesza – singer-songwriter, multi-instrumentalist and dancer
 Matt Kinch – ice hockey player
 Cathy King – curler, from St Albert
 Samantha King – singer/songwriter
 Ralph Klein – mayor of Calgary and premier of Alberta
 Cody Ko – YouTuber
 Andrew Kooman – author and playwright
 Brent Kosolofski – boxer
 Myrna Kostash – writer of eight books, including All of Baba's Children
 John Krizanc – playwright
 Chad Kroeger – lead singer and guitarist of Nickelback
 Ed Kucy – Canadian Football League player
 Norman Kwong – Canadian Football League player and Lieutenant Governor of Alberta

L
 Stephanie Labbe – Olympic soccer player
 Morgan Lander – singer/songwriter
 Daymond Langkow – ice hockey player 
 Alvin Law – motivational speaker
 Tony Law – comedian
 Sheena Lawrick – Olympic softball player
 Raymond Lemieux – organic chemist
 Stewart Lemoine – playwright
 Evangeline Lilly – actress
 Jens Lindemann – trumpet soloist
 Trevor Linden – former professional hockey player, member of the Order of Canada, president of hockey operations for Vancouver Canucks and recipient of the Order of British Columbia
 Amanda Lindhout – Journalist and humanitarian
 Bryan Little – ice hockey player
 Sam Livingston – Irish-born early settler in Calgary
 Rochelle Loewen – model who appeared briefly with WWE 
 Paul Lorieau (1942–2013) – optician and national anthem singer for the Edmonton Oilers from 1981 to 2011.
 Peter Lougheed – Canadian Football League player and Premier of Alberta
 Lowell – electropop musician
 Pierre Lueders – bobsledder
 Ed Lukowich – curler
 Joffrey Lupul – ice hockey player

M
 Don MacBeth – jockey
 Jason MacDonald – Ultimate Fighting Championship fighter
 Jinder Mahal – professional wrestler
 Cale Makar – professional hockey player
 Ernest Manning – former Premier of Alberta
 Heather Marks – supermodel
 Kari Matchett – actor
 Bill Matheson – meteorologist
 Richard Matvichuk – National Hockey League player
 Wop May – pioneering aviator and bush pilot
 Ken McAuley – goaltender for the National Hockey League New York Rangers, husband of Mildred Warwick McAuley
 Frederick McCall – World War I fighter ace, businessman, stuntman
 Trent McClellan – comedian
 Nellie McClung – first woman appointed to the Board of Governors of the Canadian Broadcasting Corporation (1936), one of the Famous Five
 Don McCrimmon – politician
 Bruce McCulloch – actor, writer, comedian, and film director
 Todd McFarlane – creator of the Spawn series of comics
 Kevin McKenna – professional soccer player
 Marshall McLuhan – recipient of numerous awards and appointments, pioneer of media theory
 Tate McRae – singer/songwriter, dancer, and voice actress
 Anne-Marie Mediwake – broadcaster
 Jordan Mein – mixed martial arts fighter
 Joseph Meli – four-time Canadian Olympian (judo)
 Mark Messier – National Hockey League player 
 Barb Miller – politician
 Gord Miller – sportscaster
 Big Miller – jazz and blues singer
 Joni Mitchell – singer-songwriter and painter; born in Fort Macleod, but grew up in Saskatoon, Saskatchewan
 Carl Mokosak – National Hockey League player
 Cory Monteith – singer and actor; born in Calgary but grew up in Vancouver
 Cory Morgan – blogger
 William (Billy) Morin, Chief of Enoch Cree Nation
 Derek Morris – ice hockey player
 E. Roger Muir – creator of "Howdy Doody" TV show
 Emily Murphy – first female magistrate in British Empire and petitioned Supreme Court of Canada to allow women the vote; one of the Famous Five
 Ray Muzyka – co-founder of BioWare Corp.
 Curtis Myden – Olympic bronze medallist, swimming

N
 Issey Nakajima-Farran – professional soccer player
 Jim Neidhart – professional wrestler
 Natalya Neidhart – professional wrestler
 Naheed Nenshi – Mayor of Calgary
 Richard Newman – writer, broadcaster, and reality TV star, best known for participating in the seventh series of the British version of Big Brother
 Scott Nichol – ice hockey player
 Marjorie Nichols – journalist and writer
 Scott Niedermayer – ice hockey player
 Leslie Nielsen – film and television actor
 Amy Nixon – curler
 Rebecca Northan – actress

O
 Susan O'Connor – curler
 Kevin Ogilvie – vocalist for the industrial band Skinny Puppy
 Peter Oldring – actor
 Bud Olson – former Member of Parliament and Senator for Medicine Hat, former Lieutenant Governor of Alberta
 Ben Ondrus – ice hockey player
 Melissa O'Neil – 2005 Canadian Idol winner
 Maren Ord – singer, songwriter
 Chris Osgood – former professional hockey player
 Kelly Oxford – writer, New York Times bestselling author of Everything Is Perfect When You're a Liar
Steven Ogg – actor, best known for his roles as Simon in The Walking Dead and Trevor Philips in Grand Theft Auto V

P
 Ryan Peake – rhythm guitarist of Nickelback
 Chris Pearson – 1st Premier of Yukon
 Allen Pedersen – National Hockey League player
 Ron Pederson – stage and screen actor
 Nigel Pengelly – politician
 Jim Peplinski – former professional hockey player (Calgary Flames)
 Kelly Perlette – light middle-weight boxing gold medal at the 1978 Commonwealth Games
 P.J. Perry – jazz saxophonist
 Jordan Peterson –  University Professor
 Matt Pettinger – ice hockey player
 Dion Phaneuf – ice hockey player
 Chris Phillips – professional hockey player (Ottawa Senators)
 Rod Phillips – radio broadcaster for 630 CHED
 Annamay Pierse – swimmer born in Toronto and raised in Edmonton
 Gerry Pinder – professional hockey player
 Fernando Pisani – ice hockey player
 Justin Pogge – ice hockey player
 John "Red" Pollard – jockey of the famous horse Seabiscuit
 Tara-Jean Popowich – winner of So You Think You Can Dance Canada (Season 2)
 Glenn Price – conductor
 Doug Pruden – multiple world records in push ups
 Al Purvis (1929–2009) – assistant captain of the Edmonton Mercurys
 Jamie Pushor – hockey player
 Mark Pysyk – ice hockey player for the Buffalo Sabres

Q
 Quanteisha – singer
 Tegan and Sara Quin – musicians

R
 Theo de Raadt – programmer, founder of OpenBSD and OpenSSH software projects
 Lobsang Rampa – Tibetan Lama
 Jan Randall – composer
 Heather Rankin – curler
 Duncan Regehr – actor
 Steve Regier – ice hockey player
 Alyssa Reid – singer/songwriter
 Steven Reinprecht – ice hockey player
 Chris Reitsma – professional baseball player
 Nick Ring – professional mixed martial arts fighter
 Purity Ring – electronic duo
 Kelly Rissling – ice hockey player
 Douglas Roche – O.C., former M.P., senator, U.N. ambassador, nuclear disarmament figure, author, and journalist
 Steve Rodehutskors – Canadian football player
 Stacy Roest – hockey player
 Hey Romeo – country singer/songwriter
 Chava Rosenfarb – author and Holocaust survivor
 Matthew Rowley – ski jumper
 Mark Rypien – quarterback and most valuable player in Super Bowl XXVI
 Rick Rypien – former NHL player (Vancouver Canucks)

S
 Jamie Salé – Olympic gold medallist skater
 Willie Saunders – Montana-born Hall of Fame jockey, won U.S. Triple Crown
 Mary Scott – visual artist
 Patrick Sharp – professional ice hockey player (Dallas Stars); born in Winnipeg, Manitoba, raised in Calgary and later Thunder Bay, Ontario and Burlington, Vermont
 Kyle Shewfelt – Olympic gold medallist
 Keith Shologan – professional Canadian football player
 Barbara Sibbald – novelist and journalist
 Rhonda Sing – professional wrestler
 Shiloh – singer/songwriter
 Brox Sisters – singers (Brock sisters)
 Laurie Skreslet – first Canadian to climb Mount Everest
 Harry Smith – professional wrestler
 Jason Smith – retired professional ice hockey player
 Linda Smith – novelist
 Keegan Soehn – trampoline gymnast
 Monte Solberg – Conservative politician
 Ron Southern – businessman and founder of Spruce Meadows
 Donald H. Sparrow – businessman and Conservative politician
 Jay Sparrow – singer/songwriter
 Paul Spence – actor; portrays headbanger Dean Murdoch in FUBAR
 George Stanley – designer of the current Canadian flag
 Vic Stasiuk – hockey player
 David Stephan
 Stan Stephens – former Governor of Montana
 Stereos – pop rock band
 Richard Stevenson – poet
 Catherine Mary Stewart – film and television actor
 Ryan Stock – TV circus stuntman
 Charlie Storwick – musician, actress in Some Assembly Required
 Jason Strudwick – ice hockey player
 Darryl Sydor – ice hockey player

T
 Theo Tams – winner of Canadian Idol Season 6 (2008)
 Barb Tarbox – anti-smoking activist
 Ari Taub – Olympic Greco-Roman wrestler
 Ken Taylor – Canadian ambassador to Iran; helped six Americans escape from Iran during the Iran hostage crisis under operation nicknamed Canadian Caper
 Mark Tewksbury – Olympic gold medallist swimming
 Robert Thirsk – astronaut
 Tenille Townes – singer
 Arnold Tremere – executive director of the Canadian International Grains Institute
 Adam Trupish – boxer
 Kreesha Turner – singer/songwriter

V
 Alan Van Sprang – actor
 Shaun Van Allen – National Hockey League player
 Pete Vandermeer – ice hockey player
 Chad VanGaalen – musician
 Greg Vavra – football player
 Mike Vernon – former professional National Hockey League player; won with the Calgary Flames in 1989
 Kris Versteeg – hockey player
 Doug Vogt – photojournalist

W
 Allan Wachowich – former Chief Justice of the Court of Queen's Bench of Alberta
 Cam Ward – professional ice hockey goaltender (Carolina Hurricanes); born in Saskatoon, Saskatchewan, but grew up in Edmonton
 Max Ward – aviator and founder of Wardair airlines
 John Ware – pioneer rancher
 Cadence Weapon (Rollie Pemberton) – rapper
 Bronwen Webster – curler
 Crystal Webster – curler
 Kenneth Welsh – film and television actor
 Michael Wex – novelist and playwright
 Ray Whitney – retired professional ice hockey player; played from 1991 to 2014
 TJ Wilson – professional wrestler
 David Winning – film and television director, Stargate: Atlantis, Andromeda, Syfy Channel movies

Z
 Alfie Zappacosta – singer, songwriter
 Greg Zeschuk – co-founder of BioWare Corp.